Princess Marie Louise of Orleans may refer to:

Marie Louise d'Orléans (1662–1689), eldest daughter of Philippe de France and Princess Henrietta Anne of England; later Queen of Spain as wife of Charles II
Princess Marie Louise Élisabeth d'Orléans (1695–1719), daughter of Philippe II, Duke of Orléans, wife of Charles, Duke of Berry 1686–1714
Princess Marie Louise of Orléans (1896–1973), daughter of Prince Emmanuel, Duke of Vendôme and Princess Henriette of Belgium